Caradog, Caradoc, Caradawg, or Cradawg, Latinised as Caratacus and anglicised as Craddock, is a given name for men in the Welsh language. It may refer to:

People
 Caradog ap Bran, son of Bran the Blessed in Welsh mythology
 Caratacus, first-century British chieftain at the time of the Roman conquest
 Caradocus, mythical British king of the fourth century
 Caradoc, suitor of Saint Winifred
 Caradog ap Meirion, eighth-century king of Gwynedd
 Caradoc, figure from history and the Matter of Britain
 Caradoc of Llancarfan, twelfth century author of a Life of Gildas
 Saint Caradoc, 12th century Welsh hermit
 Griffith Rhys Jones (Caradog), conductor of the Côr Mawr of some 460 voices (the South Wales Choral Union), which twice won first prize at Crystal Palace choral competitions in London in the 1870s.
 Caradog Roberts, 19th century Welsh composer
 Caradog Prichard, 20th century Welsh poet and novelist
 An antagonist named for Griffith Rhys Jones in Susan Cooper's novel The Grey King

Other uses
Caradoc, Ontario, a Canadian township now part of Strathroy-Caradoc
Caer Caradoc, a hill in the English county of Shropshire
Caer Caradoc (Chapel Lawn), an Iron Age hill fort in Shropshire
Caradoc Series, a geological subdivision of the Ordovician System
 HMS Caradoc, two ships of the Royal Navy

See also
 Ceretic (disambiguation)
 Cerdic of Wessex
 Craddock (disambiguation)
 Cradock (disambiguation)

Welsh masculine given names